Modrac Lake (Bosnian: Jezero Modrac) is an artificial lake in Bosnia and Herzegovina. Located in the municipality of Lukavac, it is home to many species of fish and is popular with fishermen.

A 2005 effort to turn it into a tourist attraction was unsuccessful because of local government neglect and inhabitants' practice of dumping garbage on the shore.  The resulting disease and bacteria made it undesirable for swimming.  As a result, tourists lost interest in the lake. 

A cable car for goods transport crosses Modrac Lake.

See also
List of lakes in Bosnia and Herzegovina

References

Lakes of Bosnia and Herzegovina